The Saskatchewan Senior Hockey League (SSHL) was a senior amateur ice hockey league that operated in the Canadian province of Saskatchewan on-and-off from 1938 to 1971.

History
Before the 1938–39 season there were Northern and Southern leagues in the province. They merged in 1938 to form the one provincial league. The championship team went on in the Allan Cup as Saskatchewan's representative. In 1941 the Regina Rangers won the SSHL's only Allan Cup title.

The league carried on through most of World War II but disbanded in 1944-45 because of a shortage of players and the difficulty of travelling. From the 1945–46 season through the 1949-50 season, senior teams in Regina and Saskatoon joined up with Calgary and Edmonton to form the Western Canada Senior Hockey League (WCSHL). The SSHL lay dormant until 1950 when the WCSHL moved up to the major level and competed for the Alexander Cup.

The SSHL was revived for 1950–51, again sending its champions to the Allan Cup playoffs, but only lasted until 1954–55. The Western Hockey League (WHL) operated in the province and the SSHL could not compete. It started up again in 1958-59 after the WHL left the province and operated until 1964–65. In 1965 the teams again merged with teams from Alberta to form a revived Western Canada Senior Hockey League. This new league lasted for two seasons when the teams again split on provincial lines.

The SSHL started up again in 1967-68 and lasted until 1971 when another merger formed the Prairie Senior Hockey League.

Notable people
 Al Pickard, league president from 1940 to 1942, and again from 1951 to 1953.

Champions
1938-39: Saskatoon Quakers
1939-40: Moose Jaw Millers
1940-41: Regina Rangers
1941-42: Saskatoon Quakers
1942-43: Regina Army Capitals
1943-44: Flin Flon Bombers
1944-1950 did not operate
1950-51: Yorkton Legion
1951-52: Melville Millionaires
1952-53: Regina Caps
1953-54: Moose Jaw Millers
1954-1958 did not operate
1958-59: Regina Caps
1959-60: Saskatoon Quakers
1960-61: Moose Jaw Pla-Mors
1961-62: Saskatoon Quakers
1962-63: Saskatoon Quakers
1963-64: Saskatoon Quakers
1964-65: Moose Jaw Pla-Mors
1965-1967 did not operate
1967-68: Yorkton Terriers
1968-69: Regina Caps
1969-70: Yorkton Terriers
1970-71: Yorkton Terriers

See also
Western Canada Senior Hockey League
Western Canada Senior Hockey League (1965-1968)
Prairie Senior Hockey League

References

External links
League profile on hockeydb.com

Defunct ice hockey leagues in Saskatchewan